Dayana Yastremska was the defending champion but chose not to defend her title.

Elina Svitolina won the title, defeating Elena Rybakina in the final, 6–4, 1–6, 6–2.

Seeds
The top two seeds that played received a bye into the second round

Draw

Finals

Top half

Bottom half

Qualifying

Seeds

Qualifiers

Lucky losers

Draw

First qualifier

Second qualifier

Third qualifier

Fourth qualifier

References

External links
Main Draw
Qualifying Draw

Internationaux de Strasbourg - Singles
2020 Singles